Wizardzz is an electropop/noise pop band consisting of Brian Gibson (of Lightning Bolt) on drums and Rich Porter (of Bug Sized Mind) on synthesizer. Their debut album Hidden City of Taurmond was released on March 21, 2006, under the independent label Load Records.

Discography

Albums 
 Hidden City of Taurmond (2006)

External links
Wizardzz Homepage on Load Records

Electronic music groups from Rhode Island
American synth-pop groups
Electropop groups
Noise pop musical groups
Load Records artists